The Stardust Star of the Year Award – Male is chosen by the readers of the annual Stardust magazine. The award honours a star that has made an impact with their acting in a film. The first actor to receive this awards was Ajay Devgan in 2003. Amitabh Bachchan has won 4 awards, Akshay Kumar has won 3 awards, while Salman Khan, Shahrukh Khan & Sanjay Dutt have 2 awards each.

List of winners

See also 
 Stardust Awards
 Bollywood
 Cinema of India

References 

Stardust Awards